Hypogeomys is a genus of rodents in the family Nesomyidae, found in Madagascar. There is one extant species, the Malagasy giant rat (Hypogeomys antimena), currently an endangered species with a restricted range. There is also another species known from subfossils from a few thousand years ago, Hypogeomys australis. H. antinema measures , making it the largest rodent in Madagascar, while H. australis seems to have been slightly larger.

References 

 
Taxa named by Alfred Grandidier
Rodent genera
Mammal genera with one living species